The Lyric Theatre is a historic theater located at 59 Southwest Flagler Avenue in downtown Stuart, Florida. The building fronts on its north side on Southwest Osceola Street. Built to serve as a movie house, it is now used primarily as a stage and music venue. Additions were made on the west side to provide back stage space for these new uses. The additions also face on both streets. On November 12, 1993, it was added to the U.S. National Register of Historic Places.

References

External links

 Martin County listings at National Register of Historic Places
 Florida's Office of Cultural and Historical Programs
 Martin County listings
 Lyric Theatre
 Lyric Theatre

National Register of Historic Places in Martin County, Florida
Cinemas and movie theaters in Florida
Stuart, Florida
Theatres on the National Register of Historic Places in Florida